was a sub-unit of all-female Japanese pop group AKB48, produced by Yasushi Akimoto.

History
It was announced on June 28, 2010 by Kashiwagi Yuki that French Kiss would be formed and debuted with a single , at AKB48 Team-B's stage performance. "Zutto mae kara" was used as the ending theme song for anime "Major sixth season", broadcast on NHK Educational TV.

After 4 months from release of the 1st single on September 8, 2010, they released 2nd single "If" on January 19, 2011, which ranked 2nd after Tomohisa Yamashita's single  on Oricon Weekly Chart, and 1st on Billboard Japan Hot 100 ranking dated on January 31, bounced up from 73rd on prior week's ranking. The 4th single"Saisho no mail"(最初のメール) was released on November 22, 2011.

In 2015, the sub-unit was disbanded.

Members 
 (AKB48's Team B)
 (AKB48's Team K)
 (AKB48's Team B, NGT48)

Discography

Singles 

*RIAJ Digital Tracks established April 2009.

References

External links 
  

 
AKB48 sub-units
Avex Group artists
Japanese girl groups
Japanese idol groups
Japanese musical trios
Musical groups established in 2010
Japanese pop music groups
Musical groups disestablished in 2015
2010 establishments in Japan
2015 disestablishments in Japan